The Club Imperial was a nightclub owned by George Edick (1928 – 2002), located at 6306-28 West Florissant Ave. in north St. Louis. During the club's heyday in the 1950s through the 1960s, acts such as Ike & Tina Turner, Chuck Berry, and Bob Kuban and the In-Men performed at the Club Imperial. Jimmy Forrest, known for his 1952 hit "Night Train," played piano at the club for years. In the following decades, the building went through different ownership and was almost demolished in 2018, but preservationists fought to save the site of the historic music venue.

History 
The two-story building which is the site of the Club Imperial and the Imperial Hall was built in 1928. It was a dance hall, bowling alley, and restaurant complex in an all-white neighborhood. In 1952, George Edick from Chicago purchased the hall, and then booked swing bands such as Stan Kenton's orchestra. Soon, Rhythm & Blues was taking over the city as the word got across the river of the exciting bands in East St. Louis.

In 1954, bandleader Ike Turner relocated his Kings of Rhythm from Clarksdale to East St. Louis where he built his own nightclub, Manhattan Club. Edick got word of the buzz about Turner and booked his band to revitalize the Club Imperial. Turner's King's of Rhythm became the hottest attraction in the St. Louis music scene, attracting black and white audiences. Gabriel, a DJ and musician who started his career on St. Louis radio in 1953 remembered: "Ike Turner just took over this area. He created a ripple effect with his energy and ambition, he sent word back to Mississippi and was followed here by Albert King and Little Milton, he was a premier blues pianist who later became a great guitarist."

After Ike & Tina Turner attained success with their single "A Fool In Love" and moved to California, they continued to occasionally perform at the Club Imperial. They recorded their first live album, Ike & Tina Turner Revue Live, at the club in 1964. Greg Edick, son of the owner George Edick, grew up in the club and later took over ownership. He recalled that Jimi Hendrix was a guitarist in the Ike & Tina Turner Revue, but he was fired for his long solo that "brought the dancers to a halt." Hendrix met Jazz musician Miles Davis at the club, and Davis remarked that Hendrix's guitar sounded like a "machine gun." The Turners were performing at the club in July 1966 when the Rolling Stones paid a visit and invited them to be the opening act on their 1966 British tour.

Robert Vroman bought the building in August 2017 in an auction. By the following year, no one offered to buy it for renovation and that it's too dilapidated to save, he said. A beauty products company wanted to buy the building, demolish it and build a new structure. In January 2018, The St. Louis Preservation Board unanimously denied a demolition permit for the former Club Imperial.

References

External links 

 Club Imperial on The Metro St. Louis Live Music Historical Society

Music venues in St. Louis
Music venues in Missouri
Buildings and structures in St. Louis County, Missouri
Ike Turner